Disphysema is a genus of Scarabaeidae or scarab beetles, containing a single described species, D. candezei.

References

Scarabaeidae
Monotypic Scarabaeidae genera